Jürgen Stiefel (born 21 December 1953) is a German water polo player. He competed at the 1972 Summer Olympics and the 1976 Summer Olympics.

References

External links
 

1953 births
Living people
German male water polo players
Olympic water polo players of West Germany
Water polo players at the 1972 Summer Olympics
Water polo players at the 1976 Summer Olympics
People from Esslingen am Neckar
Sportspeople from Stuttgart (region)